East Timor participated tn the 2010 Asian Para Games–First Asian Para Games in Guangzhou, China from 13 to 19 December 2010. Athletes from Timor-Leste competed three events.

References

Nations at the 2010 Asian Para Games
2010 in East Timorese sport